Puduvayal is a town in Karaikudi taluk, Sivaganga district in the Indian state of Tamil Nadu. It is a town located in the Chettinad region of the Sivagangai district. On road, it is 12 km away from Karaikudi and 21 km away from Aranthangi. This town is famous for its rice mills. Puduvayal is the 2nd largest rice producer in Tamil Nadu. Puduvayal is an important commercial centre for trade in the Sivaganga district and part of the suburban region of Karaikudi. The town is famous for its Veerasekara Umaiyambigai Temple (Sakkottai area). Nearby Kandanur is famous for Kandanur Sivan Kovil—which is a replica of the Madurai Meenakshi Temple—built by Nagarthars.

Location
The town is situated in the Sivagangai District. It is about 10 kilometers from Karaikudi on the Karaikudi-Aranthangi road in Tamil Nadu, India. The town is at an altitude of 39 ft. Its pincode is 630–108.

Transportation
There is a railway station in the town on the Karaikudi - Mayiladuthurai converted in to broad-gauge. The town is connected by road with all important cities. The frequent town buses are available from karaikudi old bus stand to puduvayal bus stand. Regular bus services are available from Chennai, Karaikudi, Paramakudi, Madurai, Pattukkottai, Aranthangi, Alangudi, Devakottai, Sivagangai, Rameshwaram,Embel, Pudukkottai, Peraoorani,Nagoor, Tiruvarur,kottaipattanam, other towns and nearby villages .The town is very close to The city karaikudi that connecting buses from all the important cities of Tamilnadu.The town has a large number of rice mills and therefore, has a heavy influx of goods carriers.

Education
 Ramanathan Chettiar Higher Secondary School
 Sri Saraswathi Vidhyalaya Girls Higher Secondary School
Sri saraswathi vidhya salai 
 Ramanathan Chettiar Elementary School
 Al-Ameen Nursery School
 Sri Kalaimagal Vidhyalaya Matric School
 Valliammai Achi Montessori School
 Sri Vidhyagiri Matriculation School
Sri Vidhyagiri Arts & Science College
Abdul Kalam College of Nursing & Catering
Annamalai Para-Medical College

Sports
The New Land Football Club (NLFC) is the most famed club in the village, they conduct a tournament every year, which is a huge crowd-pulling event. Friends Volleyball Club was founded here in 1986. This club hosts tournaments every year where teams from all over India participate. There are many famous cricket teams here, such as: WALLS-108 (only quick matches), and RCC.

786 Cricket Club is a famous cricket team in this town they conducted tournaments every year. They host cricket tournaments every year.

Demographics
As of a 2001 Indian census males constitute of 50% of the population and females, 50%. Puduvayal has an average literacy rate of 74%, higher than the national average of 59.5%:

male literacy is 81%, and female literacy is 66%. In Puduvayal, 12% of the population is under 6 years of age.

References

External links
 
 https://www.facebook.com/Puduvayal

Cities and towns in Sivaganga district